NGC 191A (also  PGC 2332, IC 1563, MCG -2-2-76 of ARP 127) is a lenticular galaxy in the constellation Cetus.

In 2006 a supernova was discovered in this galaxy and was designated SN 2006ej.

See also 
 List of NGC objects

References 

Lenticular galaxies
Cetus (constellation)
0191A
IC objects